Isaac Phillips Fetterman (1 September 1887  – 5 December 1924) was an American racecar driver who participated in the 1922 Indianapolis 500.

Biography
He was born on September 1, 1887, in Pittsburgh, Pennsylvania to Charles Douglass Fetterman and Medora E. Phillips. During World War I he served as a captain in the Royal Flying Corps.

In 1917 he broke several records at Uniontown Speedway.

On September 5, 1921, he won the Autumn Classic at Uniontown Speedway.

He participated in the 1922 Indianapolis 500 using a Duesenberg Straight-8 engine. He finished 7th winning $1,800 ($23,000 in 2010 dollars).

He died on December 5, 1924, in Pittsburgh, Pennsylvania at age 37.

Indy 500 results

References

1887 births
1924 deaths
Indianapolis 500 drivers
Sportspeople from Pittsburgh
Racing drivers from Pennsylvania
Racing drivers from Pittsburgh
AAA Championship Car drivers
Royal Flying Corps officers